Cyrtodactylus sumuroi is a species of gecko, a lizard in the family Gekkonidae. The species is endemic to Samar in the Philippines.

Etymology
The specific name, sumuroi, is in honor of Filipino hero Agustín Sumuroy, also known as Juan Sumuroy, who led a rebellion against Spanish colonialism in 1649.

Description

Reproduction
The mode of reproduction of C. sumoroi is unknown.

References

Further reading
Goldberg SR, Bursey CR (2019). "Cyrtodactylus sumuroi Endoparasites". Herpetological Review 50 (2): 372.
Oaks JR, Siler CD, Brown RM (2019). "The comparative biogeography of Philippine geckos challenges predictions from a paradigm of climate-driven vicariant diversification across an island archipelago". Evolution 73 (6): 1151–1167.
Welton LJ, Siler CD, Linkem CW, Diesmos AC, Brown RM (2010). "Philippine Bent-Toed Geckos of the Cyrtodactylus agusanensis Complex: Multilocus Phylogeny, Morphological Diversity, and Descriptions of Three New Species". Herpetological Monographs 24 (1): 55–85. (Cyrtodactylus sumuroi, new species).

Cyrtodactylus
Reptiles described in 2010